The 2020 LIU Sharks football team represented both the LIU Post and LIU Brooklyn campuses of Long Island University in the 2020–21 NCAA Division I FCS football season. They were led by 23rd year head coach Bryan Collins and played their home games at Bethpage Federal Credit Union Stadium. They played as a second–year member of the Northeast Conference. This was the final season as head coach for Collins as he stepped down in June.

Schedule
LIU had games scheduled against Delaware (September 19) and Lehigh (September 26), but canceled these games before the season due to the COVID-19 pandemic.

Schedule

References

LIU
LIU Sharks football seasons
LIU Sharks football